Humboldt Township is one of twelve townships in Allen County, Kansas, United States. As of the 2010 census, its population was 253.

Geography
According to the USGS, it contains three cemeteries: Evan Young, Fussman and Saint Joseph.

The streams of Charles Branch and Slack Creek run through this township.

References

External links
 US-Counties.com
 City-Data.com

Townships in Allen County, Kansas
Townships in Kansas